Hubjeri is a village in the municipality of Novo Goražde, Republika Srpska, Bosnia and Herzegovina. According to the 2013 census, the village has a population of 80.

Demographics 
According to the 2013 census, its population was 233, with 153 of them living in the Goražde part and 80 in the Novo Goražde part.

References

Populated places in Novo Goražde
Populated places in Goražde